Greg Dalton, also known by the moniker Gary War, is an American musician whose recordings combine elements of psychedelia, garage rock, synth-pop, and shoegaze. He is a former member of Ariel Pink's Haunted Graffiti and has released three albums, a split LP with Purple Pilgrims, two EPs and several singles. Currently, he is based in New Zealand.

Career 
Dalton is originally from Gloucester, Massachusetts.

In July 2012, he released Jared's Lot on the Austrian Spectrum Spools label, and toured in support of it. He also collaborated with Taylor Richardson as Human Teenager, and released the album Animal Husbandry in the same year. Towards the end of that year, he moved to New Zealand.

In November 2013 War shared an album with the New Zealand duo Purple Pilgrims, contributing four songs to the release on Upset The Rhythm.

Discography

Studio albums
New Raytheonport LP (2008, SHDWPLY Records)
Horribles Parade LP (2009, Sacred Bones Records)
Jared's Lot LP (2012, Spectrum Spools)
Gaz Forth LP (2018, Feeding Tube)

EPs
Galactic Citizens 12" (2009, Captured Tracks)
Police Water 12" (2010, Sacred Bones Records)
Gary War/Purple Pilgrims Split LP (2013, Upset The Rhythm)

Other releases
"Anhedonic Man" 7" (2009, Hell, Yes!)
"Zontag" 7" (2009, Sacred Bones Records)
"Reality Protest" 7" (2009, Sacred Bones/Holidays Records)
"Opens" Cassette (2009, Captured Tracks)

References

External links
http://www.garywar.com
Soundcloud.com

Year of birth missing (living people)
American rock musicians
Musicians from Boston
Living people
Hypnagogic pop musicians